Gary Lawyer (born 1959) is an Indian singer-songwriter known for his works predominantly in Western Music & Bollywood. He started his career as a nightclub singer in New York City. Also known as " The man with a golden voice".

Career
He is the first Indian to be signed for a western album outside India and the first English music video "nights on Fire" to be played on MTV in India.
Lawyer has a bass baritone, who sings in the tenor range. During his youth he studied music in New York City, before returning to his roots in Bombay to further build his career, leaving behind the many contracts he was offered in NY.

Today he is known in India as "the man with a golden voice". As well as music from his own albums he also sings covers by great rock & jazz musicians such as The doors, Frank Sinatra, Elvis, Freddie Mercury and many more. He has been the opening act for many international musicians such as Bon Jovi, Bryan Adams, Def Leppard, and has even played tributes to "Queen" by playing for Freddie Mercury's family and friends.

Gary also has broadened his horizons and sung for Bollywood Films as well which have gone on to become hits. That said he has been perhaps the greatest inspiration for young Indian rockers, never giving up on his goal- always pushing for the talent in western forms of music to finally step into the light in a world which is dominated to Hindi/  Bollywood music.

Songs

 "Arrow in the Dust"
 "Highway to Heaven"
 "Nights on Fire"
 "This Cannot Wait"
 "The Other Side of Dawn"
 "Deep Blue Dusk"
 "Indian Summer"

Albums
 Unbelong
 Other Side of dawn
 Nights on Fire
 Arrow in the Dust

Selected filmography 
(vocals)
 Road (2002) "Road ke har Mod Pe"
 Corporate (2006) "Yahan Sabko Sab"
 Sacred Evil – A True Story (2006) "Deep Blue Dusk"
 Jahan Tum Le Chalo (1999) – "Your Face Is Face Of Love"

See also
 List of blues musicians
 List of Indians
 List of jazz musicians
 List of people from New York City
 List of singer-songwriters

References

External links
 , his official website
 

Place of birth missing (living people)
1959 births
20th-century Indian singers
Blues singer-songwriters
Cabaret singers
English-language singers from India
Jazz songwriters
Indian male playback singers
Living people
Parsi people
Singers from Mumbai
Bollywood playback singers
Nightclub performers
20th-century Indian male singers
Male jazz musicians